The 1989 World Archery Championships was the 35th edition of the event. It was held in Lausanne, Switzerland on 2–8 July 1989 and was organised by World Archery Federation (FITA).

Soviet archer Stanislav Zabrodsky, winner of the men's individual recurve competition, set 4 world records during the competition.

Medals summary

Recurve

Medals table

References

External links
 World Archery website
 Complete results

World Championship
World Archery
A
World Archery Championships